Carlos Robston Ludgero Junior (born October 20, 1979), commonly known as Robston, is a Brazilian footballer who plays as a defensive midfielder for Botafogo-PB.

Career
Robston began in the youth of the range. He also played for rival Brasiliense. In 2007 passed by Atletico-GO until you get to Botafogo to replace Leandro Guerreiro Carioca Championship in early 2008. But in the same year he returned to the club Goias.

Honours
Robston has won the Goiano Championship under the flag of Atlético Clube Goianiense two times. 2007 and 2010.

Robston has the title of champion of the Brazilian National Tournament of 3rd Division (under the flag of Atlético Clube Goianiense) at the year of 2008.

Honours
 Gama
 Campeonato Brasiliense: 2001, 2003

Brasiliense
 Campeonato Brasiliense: 2004, 2005, 2006
 Campeonato Brasileiro Série B: 2004

Atlético Goianiense
 Campeonato Goiano: 2011

Vila Nova
 Campeonato Goiano Série B: 2015
 Campeonato Brasileiro Série C: 2015

References

External links
CBF Registry (in Portuguese)

1981 births
Living people
Brazilian footballers
Campeonato Brasileiro Série A players
Brasiliense Futebol Clube players
Atlético Clube Goianiense players
Club Athletico Paranaense players
Sport Club do Recife players
Esporte Clube Vitória players
Ceará Sporting Club players
Vila Nova Futebol Clube players
Association football midfielders
Sportspeople from Federal District (Brazil)